Raymond Lamar Davis (June 15, 1921 – February 23, 2008) was an American football player.  He played professionally in the All-America Football Conference (AAFC) with the Miami Seahawks in 1946 and the Baltimore Colts from 1947 to 1949.  Davis was born in Brunswick, Georgia and attended Glynn Academy. He went to college at the University of Georgia and played for the Bulldogs from 1940 until 1942.  He was a member of the 1942 Georgia team that won the Southeastern Conference (SEC) title and a national championship.  His catch that season of a 65-yard touchdown pass thrown by Frank Sinkwich as final horn sounded beat Auburn. Davis was drafted by the Philadelphia Eagles in the second round with the 12th overall pick of the 1943 NFL Draft before they merged with the Pittsburgh Steelers to become the so-called "Steagles." Listed at 6'1" and 185 pounds, he played on offense and defense scoring numerous touchdowns as a receiver and making several interceptions as a pro. His nickname was "Racehorse". Davis resided in St. Simons Island, Georgia. He was inducted into the State of Georgia Sports Hall of Fame in 1990.

References

1921 births
2014 deaths
American football ends
Georgia Bulldogs football players
Miami Seahawks players
Baltimore Colts (1947–1950) players
People from Brunswick, Georgia
Players of American football from Georgia (U.S. state)